The Lincoln School Building is a former school building in Virginia, Minnesota, United States.  It was built in 1922 in the Jacobean Revival style, which was popular nationwide for educational facilities in the early 20th century.  In 1978 it listed on the National Register of Historic Places for its local significance in the theme of architecture.  It was nominated for being the city's only remaining school building to embody this emblematic early-20th-century architectural style with virtually no later alterations.

See also
 National Register of Historic Places listings in St. Louis County, Minnesota

References

1922 establishments in Minnesota
Buildings and structures in Virginia, Minnesota
Defunct schools in Minnesota
Former school buildings in the United States
Jacobean architecture in the United States
National Register of Historic Places in St. Louis County, Minnesota
School buildings completed in 1922
School buildings on the National Register of Historic Places in Minnesota
Schools in St. Louis County, Minnesota